Allanson Mervyn Henry Kelaart (7 May 1908 – 2 February 1968) was a Ceylonese cricketer who played first-class cricket between 1932 and 1940. He scored Ceylon's first international century.

Mervyn Kelaart was a left-handed batsman who was particularly proficient at cutting and leg-glancing, and a right-arm medium-pace bowler. At St. Joseph's College, Colombo, he headed both the batting and bowling averages. On Ceylon's first tour, to India in 1932-33, batting at number three he scored a century in the first of the two matches against India, 101 out of Ceylon's total of 287. His brother Ed was Ceylon's captain in the match. Mervyn also toured India in 1940-41.

He married Neliya Foenander in Colombo in June 1933. They had two daughters and two sons. In 1957 they moved to England, and 1964 they moved to Australia.

References

External links

1908 births
1968 deaths
Sri Lankan cricketers
All-Ceylon cricketers
Alumni of Saint Joseph's College, Colombo
Burgher Recreation Club cricketers
Sri Lankan emigrants to Australia